The second competition weekend of the 2010–11 ISU Speed Skating World Cup was held in the Sportforum Hohenschönhausen in Berlin, Germany, from Friday, 19 November, until Sunday, 21 November, 2009.

Schedule of events
The schedule of the event is below.

Medal summary

Men's events

Women's events

References

2
Isu World Cup, 2010-11, 2
Speed skating in Berlin
2010 in Berlin